Dardan Mushkolaj (born 2 October 1997), also known under the pseudonym Mister Dardy, is a German rapper.

He was born into an Albanian family from Deçan, Kosovo, in the district Zuffenhausen of Stuttgart, Germany. He rose to significant prominence in German-speaking Europe following the release of his first single "Telefon" in 2017.

Discography 

Hallo Deutschrap (2017)
Sorry (2019)
Soko Disko (2020)
Mister Dardy (2021)
DardyNextDoor (2022)

References 

1997 births
Living people
Musicians from Stuttgart
German people of Albanian descent
German rappers
21st-century German musicians
21st-century Albanian rappers